Trachia is a genus of air-breathing land snails, terrestrial pulmonate gastropod mollusks in the family Camaenidae. 

These snails are found from Western Ghats of India, Sri Lanka, Sabah and Singapore.

Species
The following species are recognized.
 Trachia albicostis (Pfeiffer, 1860)
 Trachia asperella (L. Pfeiffer, 1846)
 Trachia clarus (Godwin-Austen, 1888)
 Trachia contracta (Benson, 1864)
 Trachia cordieri (Bavay & Dautzenberg, 1908)
 Trachia crassicostata (Benson, 1848)
 Trachia diestalmena (Dautzenberg & Fischer, 1908)
 Trachia emensus (Godwin-Austen, 1888)
 Trachia fallaciosa (Férussac, 1832)
 Trachia footei Stoliczka, 1873
 Trachia hardouini (de Morgan, 1885)
 Trachia lambineti (Bavay & Dautzenberg, 1899)
 Trachia limatulata (Bavay & Dautzenberg, 1908)
 Trachia nangporensis (L. Pfeiffer, 1860)
 Trachia nilagirica (Pfeiffer, 1846)
 Trachia pilisparsa (E. von Martens, 1885)
 Trachia proxima (Férussac, 1832)
 Trachia pudica (Godwin-Austen, 1891)
 Trachia reinachae (C. R. Boettger, 1908)
 Trachia ruginosa (Férussac, 1832)
 Trachia serpentinitica Vermeulen, Liew & Schilthuizen, 2015
 Trachia smithi (Bock, 1881)
 Trachia sordida (L. Pfeiffer, 1842)
 Trachia trochalia (Benson, 1861)
 Trachia wrayi (de Morgan, 1885)
Species brought into synonymy
 Trachia balansai (Morlet, 1886): synonym of Chloritis balansai (Morlet, 1886)
 Trachia delibrata (Benson, 1836): synonym of Bouchetcamaena delibrata (Benson, 1836) (superseded combination, unaccepted combination )
 Trachia durandi (Bavay & Dautzenberg, 1900): synonym of Chloritis durandi (Bavay & Dautzenberg, 1900) (subsequent combination)
 Trachia froggatti Ancey, 1898: synonym of Westraltrachia froggatti (Ancey, 1898) (original combination)
 Trachia gabata (A. Gould, 1843): synonym of Chloritis gabata (A. Gould, 1843) (unaccepted combination )
 Trachia marimberti (Bavay & Dautzenberg, 1900): synonym of Chloritis marimberti (Bavay & Dautzenberg, 1900) (subsequent combination)
 Trachia monogramma Ancey, 1898: synonym of Trachia froggatti Ancey, 1898: synonym of  Westraltrachia froggatti (Ancey, 1898) (original combination)
 Trachia nasuta (Bavay & Dautzenberg, 1908): synonym of Chloritis nasuta (Bavay & Dautzenberg, 1909) (subsequent combination)
 Trachia norodomiana (Morlet, 1883): synonym of Trichochloritis norodomiana (Morlet, 1883) (subsequent combination)
 Trachia orthocheila Ancey, 1898: synonym of Westraltrachia derbyi (Cox, 1892) (junior synonym)
 Trachia penangensis Stoliczka, 1873: synonym of Trichochloritis penangensis (Stoliczka, 1873) (original combination)
 Trachia pseudomiara (Bavay & Dautzenberg, 1908): synonym of Bellatrachia pseudomiara (Bavay & Dautzenberg, 1909) : synonym of Trichochloritis pseudomiara (Bavay & Dautzenberg, 1909)
 Trachia vittata (Müller, 1774): synonym of Pseudotrachia vittata (O. F. Müller, 1774) (unaccepted combination)

References

 Bank, R. A. (2017). Classification of the Recent terrestrial Gastropoda of the World. Last update: July 16th, 2017.
 Schileyko, A. A. (2018). On the genus Trachia auct. (Gastropoda, Pulmonata, Camaenidae). Ruthenica. 28(4): 169-174

External links
On the genus Trachia auct. (Gastropoda, Pulmonata, Camaenidae)
Transfer of 210Po from plant to a land snail species and related risk
Effect of aestivation on food utilization in the freshwater snail Pila glbosa
 Albers, J. C.; Martens, E. von. (1860). Die Heliceen nach natürlicher Verwandtschaft systematisch geordnet von Joh. Christ. Albers. Ed. 2. Pp. i-xviii, 1-359. Leipzig: Engelman

Camaenidae